Computer Music Journal is a peer-reviewed academic journal that covers a wide range of topics related to digital audio signal processing and electroacoustic music. It is published on-line and in hard copy by MIT Press. The journal is accompanied by an annual CD/DVD that collects audio and video work by various electronic artists. Computer Music Journal was established in 1977. According to the Journal Citation Reports, the journal has a 2016 impact factor of 0.405.

References

External links
 
Journal page at publisher's website

Music journals
Publications established in 1977
MIT Press academic journals
Quarterly journals
English-language journals